Below is a list of compositions by Darius Milhaud sorted by category.

Operas 
 La brebis égarée, Op. 4 (1910–1914); 3 acts, 20 scenes; libretto by Francis Jammes; premiere 1923
 Les euménides, Op. 41 (1917–1923); L'Orestie d'Eschyle (Orestiean Trilogy No. 3); 3 acts; libretto by Paul Claudel after Aeschylus
 Les malheurs d'Orphée, Op. 85 (1924); chamber opera in 3 acts; libretto by Armand Lunel; premiere 1926
 Esther de Carpentras, Op. 89 (1925–1926); opera buffa in 2 acts; libretto by Armand Lunel; premiere 1937
 Le pauvre matelot, Op. 92 (1926); 'complainte' in 3 acts; libretto by Jean Cocteau; premiere 1927
 3 Opéras-minutes
 L'enlèvement d'Europe, Op. 94 (1927); 1 act, 8 scenes; libretto by Henri Hoppenot
 L'abandon d'Ariane, Op. 98 (1927); 1 act, 5 scenes; libretto by Henri Hoppenot
 La délivrance de Thésée, Op. 99 (1927); 1 act, 6 scenes; libretto by Henri Hoppenot
 Christophe Colomb, Op. 102 (1928, revised 1968); 2 parts, 27 scenes; libretto by Paul Claudel
 Maximilien, Op. 110 (1930); historic opera in 3 acts, 9 scenes; libretto by R.S. Hoffman after "Juarez et Maximilien" by Franz Werfel; premiere 1932
 L'opéra du gueux, Op. 171 (1937); ballad opera in 3 acts; libretto by Henri Fluchère after John Gay's The Beggar's Opera (1728)
 Médée, Op. 191 (1938); 1 act, 3 scenes; libretto by Madeleine Milhaud (his cousin and wife); premiere 1939
 Bolivar, Op. 236 (1943); 3 acts, 11 scenes; libretto by Madeleine Milhaud after Jules Supervielle
 David, Op. 320 (1952–1953); 2 parts, 5 acts; libretto by Armand Lunel; concert performance in Jerusalem in 1954; staged at La Scala in 1955
 Fiesta, Op. 370 (1958); 1 act; libretto by Boris Vian
 La mère coupable, Op. 412 (1964–1965); 3 acts; libretto by Madeleine Milhaud after Beaumarchais' play; premiere 1966
 Saint-Louis, roi de France, Op. 434 (1970); opera-oratorio in 2 parts; libretto by Henri Daublier and Paul Claudel; premiere 1972

Ballets 
 L'homme et son désir, Op. 48 (1918), for four wordless singers, solo wind, percussion and strings; scenario by Paul Claudel
 Le bœuf sur le toit, Op. 58 (1919); scenario by Jean Cocteau
 Les mariés de la tour Eiffel: Marche nuptiale and Fugue du massacre only, Op. 70 (1921, revised 1971); ballet-show; scenario by Jean Cocteau
 La création du monde, Op. 81a (1923); for small orchestra; scenario by Blaise Cendrars
 Salade (A. Flament), Op. 83 (1924); ballet chanté in 2 acts; scenario by Albert Flament
 Le Train Bleu, Op. 84 (1924); opérette dansée; scenario by Jean Cocteau
 L'éventail de Jeanne: Polka only, Op. 95 (1927); for a children's ballet to which ten French composers each contributed a dance
 La bien-aimée, Op. 101 (1928); pleyela (player piano) and orchestra after music of Schubert and Liszt; 1 act; scenario by Alexandre Benois
 Les songes, Op. 124 (1933); scenario by André Derain
 Moyen âge fleuri (Suite provençale), Op. 152d (1936)
 Moïse, Op. 219 (1940); ballet symphonique; also for orchestra: Opus Americanum No. 2, Op. 219b
 Jeux de printemps, Op. 243b (1944); after the orchestra work
 Suite française, Op. 254 (1945); original version for band, Op. 248 (1944)
 Les cloches (The Bells), Op. 259 (1946); after the poem by Edgar Allan Poe
 ’Adame Miroir, Op. 283 (1948); for 16 solo instruments; scenario by Jean Genet
 La cueillette des citrons, Op. 298b (1949–1950); intermède provençal
 Vendanges, Op. 317 (1952); scenario by Philippe de Rothschild
 La rose des vents, Op. 367 (1957); scenario by Albert Vidalie
 La branche des oiseaux, Op. 374 (1958–1959); scenario by André Chamson

Orchestral 
 Suite symphonique No. 1, Op. 12 (1913–1914); after the opera La brebis égarée, Op. 4 (1910–1914)
 Symphonie de chambre (Little Symphony) No. 1 "Le printemps", Op. 43 (1917)
 Symphonie de chambre (Little Symphony) No. 2 "Pastorale", Op. 49 (1918)
 Suite symphonique No. 2, Op. 57 (1919); after the incidental music Protée, Op. 17 (1913–1919)
 Sérénade en trois parties, Op. 62 (1920–1921)
 Saudades do Brasil, Op. 67b (1920–1921); original for piano
 Symphonie de chambre (Little Symphony) No. 3 "Sérénade", Op. 71 (1921)
 Symphonie de chambre (Little Symphony) No. 4 "Dixtour", Op. 74 (1921)
 Symphonie de chambre (Little Symphony) No. 5 "Dixtuor d'instruments à vent", Op. 75 (1922)
 3 Rag Caprices, Op. 78 (1922); original for piano
 Symphonie de chambre (Little Symphony) No. 6, Op. 79 (1923)
 2 Hymnes, Op. 88b (1925)
 Suite provençale, Op. 152c (1936); after the incidental music Bertran de Born
 Le carnaval de Londres, Op. 172 (1937)
 L'oiseau, Op. 181 (1937)
 Cortège funèbre, Op. 202 (1939); from the film score Espoir
 Fanfare, Op. 209 (1939)
 Symphony No. 1, Op. 210 (1939)
 Indicatif et marche pour les bons d'armement, Op. 212 (1940)
 Opus Americanum No. 2, Op. 219b (1940); after the ballet Moïse, Op. 219 (1940)
 Introduction et allegro, Op. 220 (1940); after Couperin: La sultane
 4 Ésquisses (4 Sketches), Op. 227 (1941); original for piano
 Fanfare de la liberté, Op. 235 (1942)
 Jeux de printemps, Op. 243 (1944); also a ballet
 La muse ménagère, Op. 245 (1945); original for piano
 Symphony No. 2, Op. 247 (1944)
 Le bal martiniquais, Op. 249 (1944); also for 2 pianos
 7 Danses sur des airs palestiniens, Op. 267 (1946–1947)
 Symphony No. 3 "Te Deum" for chorus and orchestra, Op. 271 (1946)
 Symphony No. 4 "Composée á l'occasion de Centenaire de la Révolution de 1848", Op. 281 (1947)
 Paris, Op. 284 (1948); also for 4 pianos
 Kentuckiana-Divertissement, Op. 287 (1948); also for 2 pianos
 Symphony No. 5, Op. 322 (1953)
 Suite campagnarde, Op. 329 (1953)
 Ouverture méditerranéenne, Op. 330 (1953)
 Symphony No. 6, Op. 343 (1955)
 Symphony No. 7, Op. 344 (1955)
 La couronne de Marguerite (Valse en forme de rondo), Op. 353 (1956; his contribution to Variations sur le nom de Marguerite Long); original for piano
 Le globe-trotter, Op. 358 (1956–1957); original for piano
 Les charmes de la vie (Hommage à Watteau), Op. 360 (1957); original for piano
 Aspen sérénade for chamber orchestra, Op. 361 (1957)
 Symphony No. 8 "Rhodanienne", Op. 362 (1957)
 Symphony No. 9, Op. 380 (1959)
 Symphony No. 10, Op. 382 (1960)
 Symphony No. 11 "Romantique", Op. 384 (1960)
 Les funérailles de Phocion (Hommage à Poussin), Op. 385 (1960)
 Aubade, Op. 387 (1960)
 Symphony No. 12 "Rurale", Op. 390 (1961)
 Ouverture philharmonique, Op. 397 (1962)
 A Frenchman in New York, Op. 399 (1962)
 Meurtre d'un grand chef d'état, Op. 405 (1963); dedicated to John F. Kennedy
 Ode pour les morts des guerres, Op. 406 (1963)
 Music for Boston, Op. 414 (1965)
 Musique pour Prague, Op. 415 (1965)
 Musique pour l'Indiana, Op. 418 (1966)
 Musique pour Lisbonne, Op. 420 (1966)
 Musique pour la Nouvelle-Orléans, Op. 422 (1966)
 Promenade concert, Op. 424 (1967)
 Symphonie pour l'univers claudélien, Op. 427 (1968)
 Musique pour Graz, Op. 429 (1968–1969)
 Suite en G, Op. 431 (1969)
 Musique pour Ars Nova, Op. 432 (1969)
 Musique pour San Francisco, Op. 436 (1971)
 Ode pour Jérusalem, Op. 440 (1972)

String orchestra
 Mills Fanfare, Op. 224 (1941)
 Pensée amicale, Op. 342 (1955)
 Symphoniette, Op. 363 (1957)

Wind ensemble
 Suite française, Op. 248 (1944); also for orchestra; adapted as a ballet, Op. 254 (1945)
 Normandie
 Bretagne
 Île de France
 Alsace-Lorraine
 Provençe
 2 Marches pour la libération , Op. 260 (1945–1946)
 In memoriam; dedicated to the victims of Pearl Harbor
 Gloria victoribus; World War II victory march
 West Point Suite, Op. 313 (1954)
 Musique de théâtre, Op. 334b (1954–1970); after the incidental music Saül, Op. 334
 Fanfare for brass ensemble (4 horns, 3 trumpets, 3 trombones and tuba), Op. 396 (1962)
 Introduction et Marche funèbre

Concertante 
Piano
 Poème sur un cantique de Camargue for piano and orchestra, Op. 13 (1913)
 Ballade for piano and orchestra, Op. 61 (1920)
 5 Études for piano and orchestra, Op. 63 (1920)
 3 Rag Caprices for piano and small orchestra, Op. 78 (1922); also for piano solo
 Le carnaval d'Aix, Fantasy for piano and orchestra, Op. 83b (1926); after the ballet Salade, Op. 83
 Concerto No. 1 for piano and orchestra, Op. 127 (1933)
 Fantaisie pastorale for piano and orchestra, Op. 188 (1938)
 Concerto No. 2 for piano and orchestra, Op. 225 (1941)
 Concerto No. 1 for 2 pianos and orchestra, Op. 228 (1941)
 Concerto No. 3 for piano and orchestra, Op. 270 (1946)
 Suite concertante for piano and orchestra, Op. 278a (1952); after the Concerto for marimba, vibraphone and orchestra, Op. 278 (1947)
 Concerto No. 4 for piano and orchestra, Op. 295 (1949)
 Suite for 2 pianos and orchestra, Op. 300 (1950)
 Concertino d'automne for 2 pianos and 8 instruments, Op. 309 (1951)
 Concerto No. 5 for piano and orchestra, Op. 346 (1955)
 Concert de chambre for piano and chamber orchestra (wind quintet and string quintet), Op. 389 (1961)
 Concerto No. 2 for 2 pianos and 4 percussionists, Op. 394 (1961)

Violin
 Cinéma fantaisie for violin and chamber orchestra, Op. 58b (1919); also for violin and piano; after Le Bœuf sur le toit
 Concerto No. 1 for violin and orchestra, Op. 93 (1927)
 Concertino de printemps for violin and chamber orchestra, Op. 135 (1934)
 Concerto No. 2 for violin and orchestra, Op. 263 (1946)
 Concerto No. 3 "Concert royal" for violin and orchestra, Op. 373 (1958)
 Music for Boston for violin and chamber orchestra, Op. 414 (1965)

Viola
 Concerto No. 1 for viola and orchestra, Op. 108 (1929)
 Air for viola and orchestra, Op. 242 (1944); after the Viola Sonata No. 1, Op. 240
 Concertino d'été for viola and chamber orchestra, Op. 311 (1951)
 Concerto No. 2 for viola and orchestra, Op. 340 (1954–1955)

Cello
 Concerto No. 1 for cello and orchestra, Op. 136 (1934)
 Concerto No. 2 for cello and orchestra, Op. 255 (1945)
 Suite cisalpine sur des airs populaires piémontais for cello and orchestra, Op. 332 (1954)

Other
 Concerto for percussion and small orchestra, Op. 109 (1929–1930)
 Scaramouche, Suite for alto saxophone and orchestra, Op. 165c (1939), or for clarinet and orchestra, Op. 165d (1941); also for 2 pianos, Op. 165b; after the incidental music Le médécin volant, Op. 165 (1937)
 Vif et joyeux
 Modéré
 Brazileira
 Concerto for flute, violin and orchestra, Op. 197 (1938–1939)
 Concerto for clarinet and orchestra, Op. 230 (1941)
 Suite anglaise for harmonica (or violin) and orchestra, Op. 234 (1942)
 Concerto for marimba, vibraphone and orchestra, Op. 278 (1947)
 L'apothéose de Molière, Suite for harpsichord with flute, oboe, clarinet, bassoon and string orchestra, Op. 286 (1948)
 Concerto for harp and orchestra, Op. 323 (1953)
 Concertino d'hiver for trombone and string orchestra, Op. 327 (1953)
 Concerto for oboe and orchestra, Op. 365 (1957)
 Symphonie concertante for bassoon, horn, trumpet, double bass and orchestra, Op. 376 (1959)
 Concerto for harpsichord and orchestra, Op. 407 (1964)
 Stanford sérénade for oboe solo and 11 instruments, Op. 430 (1969)

Chamber and instrumental 
Violin
 Sonata No. 1 for violin and piano, Op. 3 (1911)
 Le printemps for violin and piano, Op. 18 (1914)
 Sonata No. 2 for violin and piano, Op. 40 (1917)
 Cinéma fantaisie for violin and piano, Op. 58b (1919); also for violin and chamber orchestra; after Le bœuf sur le toit
 Impromptu for violin and piano, Op. 91 (1926)
 3 Caprices de Paganini for violin and piano, Op. 97 (1927)
 Dixième sonate de Baptist Anet in D Major, Op. 144 (1935); free transcription for violin and harpsichord
 Sonatina for 2 violins, Op. 221 (1940)
 Danses de Jacaremirim for violin and piano, Op. 256 (1945); 3 pieces
 Sonata for violin and harpsichord, Op. 257 (1945)
 Duo for 2 violins, Op. 258 (1945)
 Farandoleurs for violin and piano, Op. 262 (1946)
 Sonatina pastorale for violin solo, Op. 383 (1960)

 Viola
 4 Visages for viola and piano, Op. 238 (1943)
 Sonata No. 1 sur des thèmes inédits et anonymes de XVIIIe siècle, for viola and piano, Op. 240 (1944)
 Sonata No. 2 for viola and piano, Op. 244 (1944)
 Élégie for viola and piano, Op. 251 (1945)
 Élégie pour Pierre for viola, timpani and 2 percussionists, Op. 416 (1965)

 Cello
 Élégie for cello and piano, Op. 251 (1945)
 Sonata for cello and piano, Op. 377 (1959)

 Guitar
 Ségoviana, Op. 366 (1957)

 Harp
 Sonata, Op. 437 (1971)

Winds
 Sonatina for flute and piano, Op. 76 (1922)
 Sonatina for clarinet and piano, Op. 100 (1927)
 Exercice musical for pipeau, Op. 134 (1934)
 2 Ésquisses for clarinet and piano, Op. 227 (1941)
 Caprice, Danse, Églogue for clarinet (or saxophone, or flute) and piano, Op. 335 (1954)
 Sonatina for oboe and piano, Op. 337 (1954)
 Duo Concertante for clarinet and piano, Op. 351 (1956)

Duo
 Suite for Ondes Martenot and piano (arr. of music from Le château des papes) (1933)
 Sonatina for violin and viola, Op. 226 (1941)
 Sonatina for violin and cello, Op. 324 (1953)
 Sonatina for viola and cello, Op. 378 (1959)

Trio
 Sonata for two violins and piano, Op. 15 (1914)
 Pastorale for oboe, clarinet and bassoon, Op. 147 (1935)
 Suite for violin, clarinet and piano, Op. 157b (1936); after the incidental music Le voyageur sans bagage, Op. 157
 Suite d'après Corrette for oboe, clarinet and bassoon, Op. 161b (1937); after the incidental music Roméo et Juliette, Op. 161 (1937)

 Sonatine à 3 for string trio, Op. 221b (1940)
 String Trio, Op. 274 (1947)
 Fanfare for 2 trumpets and trombone, Op. 400 (1962)
 Piano Trio, Op. 428 (1968)

Quartets
 String Quartet No. 1, Op. 5 (1912)
 String Quartet No. 2, Op. 16 (1914–1915)
 String Quartet No. 3 with solo voice, Op. 32 (1916); poem by Léo Latil
 String Quartet No. 4, Op. 46 (1918)
 Sonata for flute, oboe, clarinet and piano, Op. 47 (1918)
 String Quartet No. 5, Op. 64 (1920)
 String Quartet No. 6, Op. 77 (1922)
 String Quartet No. 7, Op. 87 (1925)
 String Quartet No. 8, Op. 121 (1932)
 String Quartet No. 9, Op. 140 (1935)
 La reine de Saba for string quartet, Op. 207 (1939)
 String Quartet No. 10 Anniversaire ("Birthday Quartet"), Op. 218 (1940)
 String Quartet No. 11, Op. 232 (1942)
 String Quartet No. 12, Op. 252 (1945)
 String Quartet No. 13, Op. 268 (1946)
 String Quartet No. 14, Op. 291 No. 1 (1948–1949); The 14th and 15th string quartets can be performed separately as well as simultaneously as a string octet.
 String Quartet No. 15, Op. 291 No. 2 (1948–1949); For another example of a composer writing works for simultaneous performance, see 19th century composer Pietro Raimondi.
 String Quartet No. 16, Op. 303 (1950)
 String Quartet No. 17, Op. 307 (1950)
 String Quartet No. 18, Op. 308 (1950)
 Fanfare (150 mesures pour les 150 ans de la maison Heugel) for 2 trumpets and 2 trombones, Op. 400 (1962)
 Piano Quartet, Op. 417 (1966)
 Homage à Igor Stravinsky for string quartet, Op. 435 (1971)
 3 Études sur des thèmes du Comtat Venaissin for string quartet, Op. 442 (1973)

Quintets
 La création du monde, Op. 81b (1923) for piano and string quartet (arrangement by the composer of the ballet)
 La cheminée du roi René, Suite for wind quintet, Op. 205 (1939); 7 pieces
 4 Ésquisses (4 Sketches) for wind quintet, Op. 227b (1941); original for piano
 Les rêves de Jacob, Dance Suite for oboe, violin, viola, cello and double bass, Op. 294 (1949)
 Divertissement for wind quintet, Op. 299b (1958); after the film score Gauguin, Op. 299
 Quintet No. 1 for 2 violins, viola, cello and piano, Op. 312 (1950)
 Quintet No. 2 for 2 violins, viola, cello and double bass, Op. 316 (1952)
 Quintet No. 3 for 2 violins, 2 violas and cello, Op. 325 (1953–1954)
 Quintet No. 4 for 2 violins, viola and 2 cellos, Op. 350 (1956)
 Wind Quintet, Op. 443 (1973)

Sextets and septets
 String Sextet, Op. 368 (1958)
 String Septet for 2 violins, 2 violas, 2 cellos and double bass, Op. 408 (1964); The second movement of the septet, entitled 'Etude in controlled chance' is a rare example of Milhaud embracing aleatoric compositional devices.

Keyboard 
 Organ
 Sonata, Op. 112 (1931)
 Pastorale, Op. 229 (1941)
 9 Préludes, Op. 231b (1942); after the incidental music L'annonce faite à Marie, Op. 231
 Petite suite, Op. 348 (1955)

Piano
 Suite, Op. 8 (1913)
 Mazurka (1914); published in L'Album des Six (1920)
 Variations sur un thème de Cliquet, Op. 23 (1915)
 Printemps, Book I, Op. 25 (1915–1919)
 Sonata No. 1, Op. 33 (1916)
 Printemps, Book II, Op. 66 (1919–1920)
 Saudades do Brasil, Op. 67 (1920–1921); 12 pieces; also orchestrated
 Caramel Mou, Op. 68 (1920); also arranged for voice and jazz band
 3 Rag-Caprices, Op. 78 (1922); also orchestrated
 Choral, Op. 111 (1930)
 L'automne, Op. 115 (1932); 3 pieces
 L'album de Madame Bovary, Op. 128b (1933); after the film music Madame Bovary, Op. 128
 3 Valses, Op. 128c (1933); after the film music Madame Bovary, Op. 128
 4 Romances sans paroles, Op. 129 (1933)
 Promenade (Le tour de l'exposition), Op. 162 (1933, revised 1937)
 Touches blanches, Easy Pieces, Op. 222 No. 1 (1941)
 Touches noires, Easy Pieces, Op. 222 No. 2 (1941)
 Choral (Hommage à Paderewski) (1941)
 4 Ésquisses (4 Sketches), Op. 227 (1941); also orchestrated and for wind quintet
 La libertadora, Op. 236 (1943); also for 2 pianos
 La muse ménagère, Op. 245 (1944); 15 pieces; also orchestrated
 Une journée, Op. 269 (1946); 5 pieces
 Méditation, Op. 277 (1947)
 L'enfant aime, Suite "A Child Loves", Op. 289 (1948); 5 pieces
 Sonata No. 2, Op. 293 (1949)
 Jeu, Op. 302 (c.1950); published in the album Les contemporains
 Le candélabre à sept branches, Op. 315 (1951); 7 pieces
 Accueil amical, 17 Pieces for Children, Op. 326 (1944–1948)
 Hymne de glorification, Op. 331 (1953–1954)
 La couronne de Marguerite (Valse en forme de rondo), Op. 353 (1956); orchestrated for the suite Variations sur le nom de Marguerite Long
 Sonatina, Op. 354 (1956), 1956;
 Le globe-trotter, Op. 358 (1956); 6 pieces; also orchestrated
 Les charmes de la vie (Hommage à Watteau), Op. 360 (1957); also orchestrated
 Six danses en trois mouvements, Op. 433 (1969–1970); also for 2 pianos

Piano 4-Hands
 Enfantines, Suite after 3 poèmes de Jean Cocteau, Op. 59a (1920); 3 pieces

2 Pianos
 Le bœuf sur le toit, Op. 58a (1919); after the ballet
 Scaramouche, Suite, Op. 165b (1937); after the incidental music Le médécin volant, Op. 165
 La libertadora, Op. 236a (1943); 5 pieces; also for piano
 Les songes, Op. 237 (1943); 3 pieces; after the ballet, Op. 124 (1933)
 Le bal martiniquais, Op. 249 (1944); 2 pieces; also orchestrated
 Carnaval à la Nouvelle-Orléans, Op. 275 (1947); 4 pieces
 Kentuckiana, divertissement sur 20 airs du Kentucky, Op. 287 (1948); also orchestrated
 Six danses en trois mouvements, Op. 433 (1969–1970); also for piano

4 Pianos
 Paris for 4 pianos, Op. 284 (1948); also orchestrated

Works for children 
 À propos de bottes, Musical Story for Children, for voice, mixed chorus and piano (or violin and cello), Op. 118 (1932); words by René Chalupt
 Un petit peu de musique, Musical Play for children's chorus and piano, Op. 119 (1932); words by Armand Lunel
 Un petit peu d'exercice, Musical Play for children's chorus and piano, Op. 133 (1934); words by Armand Lunel
 Récréation, 4 children's songs for voice and piano, Op. 195 (1938); words by Jacqueline Kriéger
 Sornettes, Op. 214 (1940); words by Frédéric Mistral
 Deux chansons d'enfants (2 Children's Songs) for children's chorus and piano, Op. 217 (1940); words by Henri Fluchère
 Cours de solfège
 Papillon, papillonette!
 Touches noirs, touches blanches for piano, Op. 222 (1941)
 Acceuil amical (Friendly Welcome) for piano, Op. 326 (1944–1948)
 Une journée for piano, Op. 269 (1946)
 L'enfant aime (A Child Loves), 5 pieces for piano, Op. 289 (1948)
 Service pour la veille du sabbat for children's chorus and organ, Op. 345 (1955); Biblical text

Choral 
 Psaume 136 for baritone, chorus and orchestra, Op. 53 No. 1 (1918); translation by Paul Claudel
 Psaume 121 (a.k.a. Psaume 126 [Vulgata 126]) for male chorus a cappella, Op. 72 (1921); translation by Paul Claudel; written for the Harvard Glee Club after their 1921 tour of Europe
 Cantate pour louer le Seigneur for soloists, chorus, children's chorus, organ and orchestra, Op. 103 (1928); text: Psalms 117, 121, 123, 150
 2 Poèmes extraits de l'anthologie nègre de Blaise Cendrars for vocal quartet or chorus and chamber orchestra, Op. 113 (1932); text by Blaise Cendrars
 2 Élégies romaines for female vocal quartet or female chorus, Op. 114 (1932); text by Johann Wolfgang von Goethe
 La mort du tyran for mixed chorus, flute, clarinet, tuba and percussion, Op. 116 (1932); text by Lampride, translation by D. Diderot
 Adages, 16 songs for vocal quartet, chorus and chamber orchestra (or piano), Op. 120c (1932); words by André de Richaud
 Devant sa main nue for female chorus or vocal quartet, Op. 122 (1933); words by Marcel Raval
 Pan et la Syrinx, Cantata for soprano, baritone, mixed chorus, flute, oboe, alto saxophone, bassoon and piano, Op. 130 (1934); words principally by Paul Claudel
 Les amours de Ronsard, 4 songs for mixed chorus or vocal quartet and chamber orchestra, Op. 132 (1934)
 Cantique du Rhône, 4 songs for chorus or vocal quartet, Op. 155 (1936); words by Paul Claudel
 Cantate de la paix for male chorus and children's chorus, Op. 166 (1937); words by Paul Claudel
 Main tendue à tous for mixed chorus a cappella, Op. 169 (1937); words by Charles Vildrac
 Les deux cités, Cantata for mixed chorus a cappella, Op. 170 (1937); words by Paul Claudel
 Quatre chants populaires de Provence for mixed chorus and orchestra, Op. 194 (1938)
 3 Incantations for male chorus a cappella, Op. 201 (1939); Aztec poems by Alejo Carpentier
 Quatrains valaisans for mixed chorus a cappella, Op. 206 (1939); words by Rainer Maria Rilke
 Cantate de la guerre for mixed chorus a cappella, Op. 213 (1940); words by Paul Claudel
 Borechou – Schema Israël (Bless Ye the Lord – O Hear, Israel) for cantor, chorus and organ, Op. 239 (1944); Biblical text
 Kaddish (Prière pour les morts) for cantor, chorus and organ, Op. 250 (1945); Biblical text
 Pledge to Mills for unison mixed chorus and piano, Op. 261 (1945); words by George Percy Hedley
 6 Sonnets composés au secret for chorus or vocal quartet, Op. 266 (1946); text by Jean Cassou
 Symphony No. 3 "Te Deum" for chorus and orchestra, Op. 271 (1946)
 Service sacré pour le samedi matin for baritone, reciter, chorus and orchestra or organ, Op. 279 (1947); Biblical text
 Lekha Dodi (L'choh dodi) for cantor, chorus and organ, Op. 290 (1948); text from the Jewish Sabbath evening liturgy
 Naissance de Vénus, Cantata for mixed chorus a cappella, Op. 292 (1949); words by Jules Supervielle
 Barba Garibo, Cantata for mixed chorus and orchestra, Op. 298 (1949–1950); words by Armand Lunel
 Cantate des proverbes for female chorus, oboe, cello and harpsichord, Op. 310 (1950); Biblical text
 Les miracles de la foi, Cantata for tenor, chorus and orchestra, Op. 314 (1951); Biblical text from Daniel
 Le château de feu, Cantata for chorus and orchestra, Op. 338 (1954); text by Jean Cassou; written in memory of Jews killed during the war by the Nazis
 3 Psaumes de David for mixed chorus a cappella, Op. 339 (1954)
 2 Poèmes de Louise de Vilmorin for chorus or vocal quartet, Op. 347 (1955); words by Louise Leveque de Vilmorin
 Le mariage de la feuille et du cliché for soloists, chorus, orchestra and tape, Op. 357 (1956); text by Max Gérard, musique concrète by Pierre Henry
 La tragédie humaine for chorus and orchestra, Op. 369 (1958); text by Agrippa d'Aubigné
 8 Poèmes de Jorge Guillén for mixed chorus a cappella, Op. 371 (1958); words by Jorge Guillén
 Cantate de la croix de Charité for soloists, chorus, children's chorus and orchestra, Op. 381 (1959–1960); text by Loys Masson
 Cantate sur des textes de Chaucer for chorus and orchestra, Op. 386 (1960); text by Geoffrey Chaucer
 Cantate de l'initiation for mixed chorus and orchestra (or organ), Op. 388 (1960); Hebrew and French liturgical text
 Traversée for mixed chorus, Op. 393 (1961); words by Paul Verlaine
 Invocation à l'ange Raphaël, Cantata for double female chorus and orchestra, Op. 395 (1962); words by Paul Claudel
 Caroles, Cantata for chorus and 4 instrumental groups, Op. 402 (1963); text by Charles d'Orléans
 Pacem in terris, Choral Symphony for alto, baritone, chorus and orchestra, Op. 404 (1963); text by Pope John XXIII
 Cantate de Job (Cantata from Job) for baritone, chorus and organ, Op. 413 (1965); Biblical text
 Promesse de Dieu for mixed chorus a cappella, Op. 438 (1971–1972); Biblical text
 Les momies d'Égypte, Choral Comedy for mixed chorus a cappella, Op. 439 (1972); text by Jean-François Regnard
 Ani maamin, un chant perdu et retrouvé for soprano, 4 reciter, chorus and orchestra, Op. 441 (1972); text by Elie Wiesel

Vocal 
 Solo voice
 Cantique de Notre-Dame de Sarrance, Op. 29 (1915); words by Francis Jammes

 Voice and organ
 5 Prières for voice and organ (or piano), Op. 231c (1942); Latin liturgical texts adapted by Paul Claudel
 Ecoutez mes enfants for voice and organ, Op. 359 (1957)

 Voice and piano
 Désespoir (1909); words by Armand Lunel
 Poèmes de Francis Jammes, 2 Sets, Op. 1 (1910–1912); words by Francis Jammes
 3 Poèmes de Léo Latil, Op. 2 (1910–1916); words by Léo Latil
 Poèmes de Francis Jammes, Set 3, Op. 6 (1912); words by Francis Jammes
 7 Poèmes de La connaissance de l'est, Op. 7 (1912–1913); words by Paul Claudel
 Alissa, Song Cycle for soprano and piano, Op. 9 (1913, revised 1930); words by André Gide
 3 Poèmes en prose de Lucile de Chateaubriand, Op. 10 (1913); words by Lucile de Chateaubriand
 3 Poèmes romantiques, set 1, Op. 11 (1913–1914)
 3 Poèmes romantiques, set 2, Op. 19 (1914)
 4 Poèmes de Léo Latil, Op. 20 (1914); words by Léo Latil
 Le château, Op. 21 (1914); cycle of 8 songs; words by Armand Lunel
 Poème de Gitanjali, Op. 22 (1914); words by Rabindranath Tagore; translation by André Gide
 4 Poèmes de Paul Claudel for baritone and piano, Op. 26 (1915–1917); words by Paul Claudel
 D'un cahier inédit du journal d'Eugénie de Guérin, Op. 27 (1915); cycle of 3 songs; words by Eugénie de Guérin
 L'arbre exotique, Op. 28 (1915); words by Chevalier Gosse
 2 Poèmes d'amour, Op. 30 (1915); words by Rabindranath Tagore
 2 Poèmes de Coventry Patmore, Op. 31 (1915); original English words by Coventry Patmore; translation by Paul Claudel
 Poèmes juifs, Op. 34 (1916); 8 songs
 Child Poems, Op. 36 (1916); 5 songs; words by Rabindranath Tagore
 3 Poèmes, Op. 37 (1916); also with chamber orchestra; words by Christina Rossetti and Alice Meynell
 Chanson bas, Op. 44 (1917); 8 songs; words by Stéphane Mallarmé
 Dans les rues de Rio (2 versos cariocas de Paul Claudel), Op. 44a (1917); words by Paul Claudel
 2 Poèmes de Rimbaud, Op. 45 (1917); words by Arthur Rimbaud
 À la Toussaint (1911); words by Baronne de Grand Maison
 4 Poèmes de Francis Jammes, Set 4, Op. 50 (1918); words by Francis Jammes
 2 Petits airs, Op. 51 (1918); words by Stéphane Mallarmé
 Poèmes de Francis Thompson, Op. 54 (1919); words by Francis Thompson; translation by Paul Claudel
 Les soirées de Pétrograd, Op. 55 (1919); 12 songs; words by René Chalupt
 3 Poèmes de Jean Cocteau, Op. 59 (1920); words by Jean Cocteau
 Catalogue de fleurs for voice and piano or 7 instruments, Op. 60 (1920); words by Lucien Daudet
 Feuilles de température, Op. 65 (1920); 3 songs; words by Paul Morand
 Poème du journal intime de Léo Latil for baritone and piano, Op. 73 (1921); words by Léo Latil
 6 Chants populaires hébraïques for voice and piano or orchestra, Op. 86 (1925)
 Pièce de circonstance, Op. 90 (1926); words by Jean Cocteau
 Impromptu, Op. 91 (1926); words by Jean Cocteau
 Prières journalières à l'usage des juifs du Comtat Venaissin, Op. 96 (1927); 3 songs; Biblical text
 Vocalise, Op. 105 (1928)
 Quatrain à Albert Roussel, Op. 106 (1929); words by Francis Jammes
 A Flower Given to My Child (1930); words by James Joyce
 Le funeste retour (Chanson de marin sur un texte canadien du XVIIè siècle), Op. 123 (1933)
 Liturgie comtadine: chants de Rosch Haschanah, 5 songs for voice and piano or chamber orchestra, Op. 125 (1933)
 2 Chansons de Madame Bovary, Op. 128d (1933); words by Gustave Flaubert
 Le cygne, Op. 142 (1935); 2 versions; words by Paul Claudel
 Quatrain, Op. 143 (1935); words by Albert Flament
 3 Chansons de négresse for voice and orchestra or piano, Op. 148b (1935–1936); words by Jules Supervielle
 Chansons de théâtre, Op. 151b (1936); 6 songs; words by Jules Supervielle, R. Lenormand, G. Pitoeff
 3 Chansons de troubadour, Op. 152b (1936); words by Jean Valmy-Baisse
 5 Chansons de Charles Vildrac for voice and piano or chamber orchestra, Op. 167 (1937); words by Charles Vildrac
 Rondeau, Op. 178 (1937); words by Pierre Corneille
 Airs populaires palestiniens, Op. 179 (1937)
 Holem tsuadi
 Gam hayom
 Quatrain, Op. 180 (1937); words by Stéphane Mallarmé
 La couronne de gloire, Cantata for voice and chamber ensemble (flute, trumpet, string quartet) or piano, Op. 211 (1940); words by Solomon ibn Gabirol, Armand Lunel
 Le voyage d'été, Op. 216 (1940); words by Camille Paliard
 4 Chansons de Ronsard for voice and orchestra or piano, Op. 223 (1940); words by Pierre de Ronsard
 5 Prières for voice and organ (or piano), Op. 231c (1942); Latin liturgical texts adapted by Paul Claudel
 Rêves, Op. 233 (1942); anonymous 20th-century text
 La libération des Antilles, Op. 246 (1944); words by Henri Hoppenot
 Printemps lointain, Op. 253 (1944); words by Francis Jammes
 Chants de misère, Op. 265 (1946); words by Camille Paliard
 3 Poèmes, Op. 276 (1947); words by Jules Supervielle
 Ballade nocturne, Op. 296 (1949); a movement from a collaborative work entitled Mouvements du cœur: Un hommage à la mémoire de Frédéric Chopin, 1849–1949; words by Louise de Vilmorin
 Les temps faciles, Op. 305 (1950); words by Marsan
 Petites légendes, Op. 319 (1952); words by Maurice Carême
 Fontaines et sources for voice and orchestra or piano, Op. 352 (1956); 6 songs; words by Francis Jammes
 Tristesses, Op. 355 (1956); cycle of 24 songs; words by Francis Jammes
 Préparatif à la mort en allégorie maritime, Op. 403 (1963); words by Agrippa d'Aubigné
 L'amour chanté, Op. 409 (1964); 9 songs

 Voice (or reciter) and ensemble
 3 Poèmes, Op. 37 (1916); also with piano; words by Christina Rossetti and Alice Meynell
 Le retour de l'enfant prodigue, cantata for 5 voices and chamber ensemble or 2 pianos, Op. 42 (1917); words by André Gide
 Psaumes 136 et 129 for baritone and orchestra, Op. 53 (1918–1919); translation by Paul Claudel
 Machines agricoles, 6 Pastorales for voice and chamber ensemble, Op. 56 (1919); Texts taken out of a catalogue for agricultural machines.
 Catalogue de fleurs for voice and chamber ensemble (or piano), Op. 60 (1920); words by Lucien Daudet
 Cocktail for voice and 3 clarinets, Op. 69 (1920); words by Larsen
 4 Poèmes de Catulle for voice and violin, Op. 80 (1923); words by Catullus
 6 Chants populaires hébraïques for voice and piano or orchestra, Op. 86 (1925)
 3 Chansons de négresse for voice and orchestra or piano, Op. 148b (1935–1936); words by Jules Supervielle
 Liturgie comtadine: chants de Rosch Haschanah, 5 songs for voice and piano or chamber orchestra, Op. 125 (1933)
 5 Chansons de Charles Vildrac for voice and piano or chamber orchestra, Op. 167 (1937); words by Charles Vildrac
 Cantate nuptial for voice and orchestra, Op. 168 (1937); Biblical text from Song of Solomon
 Cantate de l'enfant et de la mère for narrator, string quartet and piano, Op. 185 (1938); story by Maurice Carême
 Les quatre éléments, Cantata for soprano and orchestra, Op. 189 (1938, revised 1956); words by Robert Desnos
 La couronne de gloire, Cantata for voice and chamber ensemble (flute, trumpet, string quartet) or piano, Op. 211 (1940); words by Solomon ibn Gabirol, Armand Lunel
 4 Chansons de Ronsard for voice and orchestra or piano, Op. 223 (1940); words by Pierre de Ronsard
 Caïn et Abel for reciter and orchestra, Op. 241 (1944); Biblical text from Genesis
 Fontaines et sources, 6 songs for voice and orchestra or piano, Op. 352 (1956); words by Francis Jammes
 Neige sur la fleuve for voice and chamber ensemble, Op. 391 (1961); words by Tsang Yung
 Suite de quatrains, 18 poems for reciter and chamber ensemble, Op. 398 (1962); words by Francis Jammes
 Adieu, Cantata for voice, flute, viola and harp, Op. 410 (1964); words by Arthur Rimbaud
 Cantate de psaumes for baritone and orchestra, Op. 425 (1967); Psalms 129, 146, 147, 128, 127, 136 (Psalms 129 and 136 from Op. 53); translation by Paul Claudel

2 or more voices
 2 Poèmes for vocal quartet, Op. 39 (1916–1918); text by Saint Léger, René Chalupt
 2 Poèmes tupis, Op. 52 (1918); 4 female voices and hand-clapping; American Indian text
 2 Élégies romaines, Op. 114 (1932); for 2 sopranos and 2 altos or female chorus; text by Johann Wolfgang von Goethe
 Adam for soprano, 2 tenors and 2 baritones, Op. 411 (1964); text by Jean Cocteau

 2 or more voices and piano
 2 Poèmes du Gardener, Op. 35 (1916–1917); for 2 voices and piano; words by Rabindranath Tagore and Elisabeth Sainte-Marie Perrin
 No. 34 de L'église habillée de feuilles, Op. 38 (1916); for vocal quartet and piano 6-hands; words by Francis Jammes

 2 or more voices and ensemble
 Pan et la Syrinx for soprano, baritone, vocal quartet and wind quartet and piano, Op. 130 (1934); words by Pierre-Antoine-Augustin de Piis, Paul Claudel
 Cantate de l'Homme for vocal quartet, reciter and chamber ensemble, Op. 164 (1937); words by Robert Desnos
 Prends cette rose for soprano, tenor and orchestra, Op. 183 (1937); words by Pierre de Ronsard
 3 Élégies for soprano, tenor and string orchestra, Op. 199 (1939); words by Francis Jammes
 Suite de sonnets, Cantata on 16th century verses for vocal quartet and chamber ensemble, Op. 401 (1963)
 Hommage à Comenius, Cantata for soprano, baritone and orchestra, Op. 421 (1966); text by John Amos Comenius

Incidental music 
 Agamemnon, Op. 14 (1913–1914); L'Orestie d'Eschyle (Orestiean Trilogy No. 1) for soprano, male chorus and orchestra; Paul Claudel translation of the drama by Aeschylus; premiere 1927
 Protée, Op. 17 (1913–1919); for chorus and orchestra; play by Paul Claudel; 2nd version, Op. 341
 Les Choéphores, Op. 24 (1915); L'Orestie d'Eschyle (Orestiean Trilogy No. 2); Paul Claudel translation of the drama by Aeschylus; premiere 1919
 L'Ours et la Lune (1918); play by Paul Claudel
 L'annonce faite à Marie, Op. 117 (1932); for 4 voices and chamber orchestra; play by Paul Claudel; 2nd version, Op. 231
 Le château des papes, Op. 120 (1932); for orchestra; play by André de Richaud
 Se plaire sur la même fleur, Op. 131 (1934) for voice and piano; play by Moreno, translation by Casa Fuerte
 Le cycle de la création, Op. 139 (1935); for voice, chorus and orchestra; play by Sturzo
 Le faiseur, Op. 145 (1935) for flute, clarinet, saxophone and percussion; play by Honoré de Balzac
 Bolivar, Op. 148 (1935–1936); for voice, chorus and chamber orchestra; play by Jules Supervielle
 La folle du ciel, Op. 149 (1936); play by Henri-René Lenormand
 Tu ne m'échapperas jamais, Op. 151 (1936); play by Margaret Kennedy
 Bertran de Born, Op. 152a (1936); for soloists, chorus and orchestra; play by Valmy-Baisse
 Le trompeur de Séville, Op. 152e (1937); play by André Obey
 Le quatorze juillet, Op. 153 (1936); Introduction and Marche funèbre for finale of Act 1 only; play by Romain Rolland
 Le conquérant, Op. 154 (1936); for chamber orchestra; play by Jean Mistler
 Amal, ou La lettre du roi, Op. 156 (1936); for piano, violin and clarinet; play by Rabindranath Tagore and André Gide
 Le voyageur sans bagage (The Traveller without Luggage), Op. 157 (1936); for piano, violin and clarinet; play by Jean Anouilh
 Jules César, Op. 158 (1936); for flute, clarinet (or saxophone), trumpet, tuba and percussion; play by William Shakespeare
 La duchesse d'Amalfi, Op. 160 (1937); for oboe, clarinet and bassoon; Henri Fluchère after John Webster
 Roméo et Juliette, Op. 161 (1937); for oboe, clarinet and bassoon; Simone Jollivet play after Pierre Jean Jouve and William Shakespeare
 Liberté, Op. 163 (1937); Overture and Interlude only
 Le médecin volant, Op. 165 (1937); for piano and clarinet (or saxophone); play by Charles Vildrac after Molière
 Naissance d'une cité, Op. 173 (1937); 2 songs for voice and piano (or orchestra); words by Jean Richard Bloch
 Chanson du capitaine
 Java de la femme
 Macbeth, Op. 175 (1937); for flute, clarinet, bassoon, violin, cello, trumpet and percussion; play by William Shakespeare
 Hécube, Op. 177 (1937); for flute, clarinet, bassoon, trumpet and percussion; André de Richaud translation of the drama by Euripides
 Plutus, Op. 186 (1938); for voice and orchestra; Simone Jollivet translation of the drama by Aristophanes
 Tricolore, Op. 190 (1938); play by Pierre Lestringuez
 Le bal des voleurs, Op. 192 (1938); for clarinet and saxophone; play by Jean Anouilh
 La première famille, Op. 193 (1938); play by Jules Supervielle
 Hamlet, Op. 200 (1939); play by Jules Laforgue
 Un petit ange de rien du tout, Op. 215 (1940); play by Claude-André Puget
 L'annonce faite à Marie, Op. 231 (1942); 2nd version of Op. 117; play by Paul Claudel
 Lidoire, Op. 264 (1946); play by Georges Courteline
 La maison de Bernarda Alba, Op. 280 (1947); play by Federico García Lorca
 Shéhérazade, Op. 285 (1948); play by Jules Supervielle
 Le jeu de Robin et Marion, Op. 288 (1948); for voice, flute, clarinet, saxophone, violin and cello; adapted from Adam de la Halle
 Le conte d'hiver, Op. 306 (1950); Claude-André Puget translation of the Shakespeare play
 Christophe Colomb, Op. 318 (1952); for chorus and orchestra; play by Paul Claudel
 Saül, Op. 334 (1954); play by André Gide
 Protée, Op. 341 (1955); 2nd version of Op. 17; play by Paul Claudel
 Juanito, Op. 349 (1955); play by Pierre Humblot
 Mother Courage, Op. 379 (1959); play by Bertolt Brecht
  Judith , Op. 392 (1961); play by Jean Giraudoux
 Jérusalem à Carpentras, Op. 419 (1966); play by Armand Lunel
 L'histoire de Tobie et Sarah, Op. 426 (1968); play by Paul Claudel

Miscellaneous stage works 
 La sagesse, Stage Spectacle for 4 voices, reciter, mixed chorus and orchestra, Op. 141 (1935); words by Paul Claudel
 Fête de la musique, Light and Water Spectacle, Op. 159 (1937); words by Paul Claudel
 Vézelay, la colline éternelle, Op. 423 (1967)

Film scores 
 The Beloved Vagabond (1915)
 Le roi de Camargue (1921); music also by Henri Sauguet; directed by André Hugon
 L'Inhumaine (1924); directed by Marcel L'Herbier
 Actualités, Op. 104 (1928)
 La p'tite Lilie, Op. 107 (1929); directed by Alberto Cavalcanti
 Las Hurdes: Tierra Sin Pan (1932); directed by Luis Buñuel
 Hallo Everybody, Op. 126 (1933); Dutch documentary short; directed by Hans Richter
 Madame Bovary, Op. 128 (1933); directed by Jean Renoir
 L'hippocampe, Op. 137 (1934); directed by Jean Painlevé
 Tartarin de Tarascon, Op. 138 (1934); based on the novel by Alphonse Daudet; directed by Raymond Bernard
 Voix d'enfants, Op. 146 (1935); directed by Reynaud
 Le vagabond bien-aimé (The Beloved Vagabond), Op. 150 (1936); directed by Curtis Bernhardt
 Mollenard, Op. 174 (composed 1937); film released in 1938; directed by Robert Siodmak
 La citadelle du silence (The Citadel of Silence), Op. 176 (1937); collaboration with Arthur Honegger; directed by Marcel L'Herbier
 Grands feux, Op. 182 (1937); directed by Alexandre Alexeieff
 La conquête du ciel, Op. 184 (1937); directed by Hans Richter
 La tragédie impériale (a.k.a. Rasputin), Op. 187 (1938); directed by Marcel L'Herbier
 Les otages (The Mayor's Dilemma), Op. 196 (1938); directed by Raymond Bernard
 The Islanders, Op. 198 (1939); directed by Maurice Harvey
 L'espoir (Days of Hope or Man's Hope), Op. 202 (1939); written and directed by André Malraux and Boris Peskine
 Cavalcade d'amour (Love Cavalcade), Op. 204 (1939); collaboration with Arthur Honegger; directed by Raymond Bernard
 Gulf Stream, Op. 208 (1939); directed by Alexandre Alexeieff
 The Private Affairs of Bel Ami, Op. 272 (1946); directed by Albert Lewin
 Dreams That Money Can Buy, Op. 273 (1947); Ruth, Roses and Revolvers sequence only; directed by Hans Richter
 Gauguin, Op. 299 (1950); directed by Alain Resnais; used in Pictura (1951), co-directed by Resnais
 La vie commence demain (Life Begins Tomorrow), Op. 304 (1950); music also by Manuel Rosenthal; written and directed by Nicole Védrès
 Ils étaient tous des volontaires, Op. 336 (1954)
 Rentrée des classes (1956); film short; directed by Jacques Rozier
 Celle qui n'était plus (Histoire d'une folle), Op. 364 (1957); directed by G. Colpi
 Péron et Evita, Op. 372 (1958); historical TV documentary narrated by Walter Cronkite
 Burma Road and the Hump, Op. 375 (1959); historical TV documentary narrated by Walter Cronkite
 Paul Claudel, Op. 427 (1968); directed by A. Gillet

Radio scores 
 Voyage au pays du rêve, Op. 203 (1939)
 Le grand testament, Op. 282 (1948)
 La fin du monde, Op. 297 (1949); by Blaise Cendrars
 Le repos du septième jour, Op. 301 (1950); by Paul Claudel
 Samaël, Op. 321 (1953); by André Spire
 Le dibbouk, Op. 329 (1953); by S. Ansky

Electroacoustic music 
 Étude poétique, Op. 333 (1954)
 La rivière endormie (1954)

Collaborations 
 L'Album des Six
 Genesis Suite
 Homage to Paderewski

 
Milhaud, Darius